Chapter and Verse is a compilation album by Bruce Springsteen that was released on September 23, 2016. The album is a companion piece to Springsteen's 500-plus-page autobiography, Born to Run, which was released four days later. The career-spanning album features eighteen songs handpicked by Springsteen, five of which have never been released. The album contains Springsteen's earliest recording from 1966 and late '60s/early '70s songs from his tenure in The Castiles, Steel Mill and the Bruce Springsteen Band along with his first 1972 demos for Columbia Records and songs from his studio albums from 1973 until 2012.

Commercial performance 
Chapter and Verse debuted at number five on the US Billboard 200 with 29,000 units, including 27,000 traditional album sales.

Track listing 

All tracks are written by Bruce Springsteen, except where noted.

Personnel 
Adapted from the album's liner notes:

Track 1
Bruce Springsteen – vocal, guitar
 Curt Fluhr – bass 
 Vinnie Manniello – drums
 Paul Popkin – tambourine, maracas, vocals
 George Theiss – guitar, vocals
Bob Ludwig – mastering

Track 2
 Bruce Springsteen – vocal, guitar
 Bob Alfano – organ
 Curt Fluhr – bass 
 Vinnie Manniello – drums
 Paul Popkin – tambourine, maracas, vocals
 George Theiss – guitar, vocals
Bob Ludwig – mastering

Track 3
 Bruce Springsteen – vocal, guitar
 Danny Federici – organ, piano, backing vocals
 Vini Lopez – drums
 Vinnie Roslin – bass, backing vocals
 Bruce Springsteen – production
 Bob Ludwig – mastering

Track 4
 Bruce Springsteen – vocal, guitar
 Vini Lopez – drums
 David Sancious – piano, organ
 Garry Tallent – bass
 Stevie Van Zandt – guitar, backing vocals
 Bruce Springsteen – production
 Carl "Tinker" West – recording
 Bob Ludwig – mastering

Track 5
 Bruce Springsteen – vocal, guitar
 Bruce Springsteen, Mike Appel – production
 Harvey J. Goldberg – recording
 Bob Ludwig – mastering

Track 6
 Bruce Springsteen – vocal, guitar
 John Hammond – production
 S. Tonkel, Phil Giambalvo – recording
 Bob Ludwig – mastering

Track 7
 Bruce Springsteen – vocal, guitar
 Clarence Clemons – saxophone
 Suki Lahav – backing vocals
 Vini Lopez – drums
 David Sancious – piano, organ
 Garry Tallent – bass
 Mike Appel, Jim Cretecos – production
 Luis Lahav – recording, mixing
 Jack Ashkinazy – mastering

Track 8
 Bruce Springsteen – vocal, guitar
 Ernest "Boom" Carter – drums
 Clarence Clemons – saxophone
 Danny Federici – organ
 David Sancious – keyboards
 Garry Tallent – bass
 Bruce Springsteen, Mike Appel – production
 Luis Lahav – recording, mixing
 Greg Calbi – mastering

Track 9
 Bruce Springsteen – vocal, guitar
 Roy Bittan – piano
 Clarence Clemons – saxophone
 Danny Federici – organ
 Garry Tallent – bass
 Stevie Van Zandt – guitar
 Max Weinberg – drums
 Jon Landau, Bruce Springsteen – production
 Jimmy Iovine – recording
 Chuck Plotkin, Jimmy Iovine – mixing
 Mike Reese – mastering

Track 10
 Bruce Springsteen – vocal, guitar, harmonica
 Roy Bittan – piano
 Clarence Clemons – saxophone
 Danny Federici – organ
 Garry Tallent – bass
 Stevie Van Zandt – guitar, backing vocals
 Max Weinberg – drums
 Bruce Springsteen, Jon Landau, Stevie Van Zandt – production
 Neil Dorfsman – recording
 Chuck Plotkin, Toby Scott – mixing
 Ken Perry – mastering

Track 11
 Bruce Springsteen – vocal, guitar
 Bruce Springsteen – production
 Mike Batlan – recording
 Dennis King – mastering
 Bob Ludwig, Steve Marcussen – mastering consultants

Track 12
 Bruce Springsteen – vocal, guitar
 Roy Bittan – synthesizer
 Clarence Clemons – percussion
 Danny Federici – organ, piano, glockenspiel
 Garry Tallent – bass
 Stevie Van Zandt – guitar
 Max Weinberg – drums
 Bruce Springsteen, Jon Landau, Chuck Plotkin, Stevie Van Zandt – production
 Toby Scott – recording
 Bob Clearmountain – mixing
 Bob Ludwig – mastering

Track 13
 Bruce Springsteen – vocals, guitar, keyboards, bass
 Roy Bittan – piano
 Danny Federici – organ
 Max Weinberg – percussion
 Bruce Springsteen, Jon Landau, Chuck Plotkin – production
 Toby Scott – recording
 Bob Clearmountain – mixing
 Bob Ludwig – mastering

Track 14
 Bruce Springsteen – vocals, all instruments except keyboard and drums
 Roy Bittan – keyboards
 Gary Mallaber – drums
 Bruce Springsteen, Jon Landau, Chuck Plotkin – production
 Roy Bittan – additional production
 Toby Scott – recording
 Bob Clearmountain – mixing
 Bob Ludwig – mastering

Track 15
 Bruce Springsteen – vocal, guitar, harmonica
 Danny Federici – keyboard
 Gary Mallaber – drums
 Marty Rifkin – pedal steel guitar
 Garry Tallent – bass
 Bruce Springsteen, Chuck Plotkin – production
 Toby Scott – recording, mixing
 Dave Collins – mastering

Track 16
 Bruce Springsteen – vocals, guitar
 Roy Bittan – piano
 Clarence Clemons – saxophone, percussion
 Danny Federici – organ
 Nils Lofgren – guitar, backing vocals
 Patti Scialfa – backing vocals
 Garry Tallent – bass
 Stevie Van Zandt – guitar, backing vocals
 Max Weinberg – drums
 Jane Scarpantoni – cello
 Soozie Tyrell – violin, backing vocals
 Brendan O'Brien – production, mixing
 Nick DiDia – recording
 Bob Ludwig – mastering

Track 17
 Bruce Springsteen – vocals, guitar, keyboards
 Brendan O'Brien – bass
 Danny Federici – keyboards
 Steve Jordan – drums
 Marty Rifkin – pedal steel guitar
 Patti Scialfa – backing vocals
 Soozie Tyrell – violin, backing vocals
 Brendan O'Brien, Bruce Springsteen, Chuck Plotkin – production
 Toby Scott, Nick DiDia – recording
 Brendan O'Brien – mixing
 Bob Ludwig – mastering

Track 18
 Bruce Springsteen – vocals, guitar, percussion, keyboards
 Ron Aniello – guitar, bass, keyboards, drums, loops, backing vocals
 Max Weinberg – drums
 Charlie Giordano – piano, B-3 organ
 Rob Lebret – guitar, backing vocals
 Curt Ramm – trumpet
 Clarence Clemons – saxophone
 Soozie Tyrell – violin, backing vocals
 Patti Scialfa – backing vocals
 Lisa Lowell – backing vocals
 Ross Petersen – backing vocals
 Cliff Norrell – backing vocals
 NY String Chamber Consort
 Rob Mathes – orchestration, conductor
 Ron Aniello, Bruce Springsteen – production
 Ross Petersen, Ron Aniello, Rob Lebret, Cliff Norrell, Toby Scott – recording
 Bob Clearmountain – mixing
 Bob Ludwig – mastering

Technical 

 Bruce Springsteen – production
 Bob Ludwig – remastering
 Toby Scott – project supervisor
Michelle Holme – art director  
Frank Stefanko – cover photography  
Joel Bernstein, Danny Clinch, Anton Corbijn, Peter Cunningham, David Gahr, Edward Gallucci, Roz Levin, Jo Lopez, Art Maillet, Eric Meola, Billy Smith Collection, Bruce Springsteen Collection, Pam Springsteen, Frank Stefanko – interior photography

Charts and certifications

Weekly charts

Year-end charts

Certifications

References 

Bruce Springsteen compilation albums
2016 compilation albums
Columbia Records compilation albums